Megastes romula is a moth in the family Crambidae. It was described by Harrison Gray Dyar Jr. in 1916. It is found in Zacualpan, Mexico.

References

Moths described in 1916
Spilomelinae